Tommy Spangler (born August 10, 1961) is an American football coach. He is currently the special teams coordinator and defensive backs coach at Furman. He was the head coach of the Presbyterian Blue Hose football team at Presbyterian College, a position he held from 2001 to 2006 and reprised from 2017 to 2020.

Head coaching record

References

External links
 Presbyterian profile

1961 births
Living people
American football defensive backs
Georgia Bulldogs football coaches
Georgia Bulldogs football players
Georgia Southern Eagles football coaches
Louisiana Tech Bulldogs football coaches
Presbyterian Blue Hose football coaches
Coaches of American football from Georgia (U.S. state)
People from Stone Mountain, Georgia
Players of American football from Georgia (U.S. state)
Sportspeople from DeKalb County, Georgia